Gianluca Petrachi (born 14 January 1969 in Lecce) is a retired Italian footballer, and former sporting director of Serie A club Roma.

Playing career
A central midfielder, he began his career at hometown club Lecce, and played in the Serie A with Torino, Cremonese and A.C. Perugia Calcio, and also played in England for Nottingham Forest. Other clubs he played for include Nola, Taranto, Arezzo, Fidelis Andria, Venezia, Palermo and Ancona.

Managerial career
After retiring as a footballer, he returned to Ancona as a team manager.

In 2006 he was named technical area manager of Pisa, being successively promoted to director of football in the summer of 2007. He was instrumental in choosing Piero Braglia as head coach and providing the playing squad that won promotion from Serie C to Serie B, and then narrowly missing on a second consecutive promotion to Serie A the following season under the tenure of Gian Piero Ventura; he left Pisa in September 2008.

Torino
In December 2009, he was hired at Torino as an assistant to director of football Rino Foschi, then replacing him for good only one month later. Among his successes with the Granata, he achieved a promotion to Serie A in 2011, a UEFA Europa League qualification in 2014 (both under head coach Gian Piero Ventura, who then went on to coach the Italy national football team), and yet another UEFA Europa League spot in 2019; during his nine years in charge of transfer duties, many Torino players also managed to successfully break into the Italy national team, including Danilo D'Ambrosio, Matteo Darmian, Ciro Immobile and Andrea Belotti.

Roma
On 25 June 2019, Roma appointed Gianluca Petrachi as their new sporting director after reaching an agreement with Serie A rivals Torino. Petrachi signed a three-year deal to succeed Frederic Massara, who filled the role following Monchi's exit in March.
The 50-year-old officially began his new role with
Roma on 1 July 2019.

References

External links

1969 births
Living people
Italian footballers
Serie A players
A.C. Ancona players
S.S. Arezzo players
U.S. Cremonese players
U.S. Lecce players
S.S. Fidelis Andria 1928 players
Nottingham Forest F.C. players
Palermo F.C. players
A.C. Perugia Calcio players
Taranto F.C. 1927 players
Torino F.C. players
Venezia F.C. players
Association football midfielders